Télévision Nationale d'Haïti (TNH) is the state television broadcaster of Haiti. Founded December 23, 1979, under the Ministry of Information and Coordination, it was Haiti's second television station after Télé Haïti (Channels 2 and 4 with the latter in English).

In 1987, it was merged with the state-run Radio Nationale into a network called RTNH (Radio Télévision Nationale d'Haïti) and in 1995, was taken over by the Ministry of Culture.

See also
 Television in Haiti
 Media of Haiti

References

External links 
 Station on youtube
 Station LIVE on Televizyon Lakay

1976 establishments in Haiti
Haitian Creole-language mass media
Television stations in Haiti
Television channels and stations established in 1956